Gunnar Sommerfeldt (4 September 1890 – 30 August 1947) was a Danish actor and film maker.

In 1919 he directed Saga Borgarættarinnar, which was released in 1920 and was the first feature film shot in Iceland. Sommerfeldt also wrote the script, based on Gunnar Gunnarsson's novel by that name. He made his last feature film in 1921, an adaption of Knut Hamsun's Growth of the Soil, which received the Nobel Prize in Literature the year before.

Filmography

Actor
Kærlighed og Mobilisering (1915) - Grev Heinrich von Borgh
Nattens gaade (1915)
Fyrstindens skæbne - Alf Hardy (1916)
Lotteriseddel No. 22152 - Belling, Detective (1916)
Pro Patria (1916)
Hotel Paradis (1917)
Synd skal sones (1917)
Gillekop (1919)
Rytterstatuen - Baron v. Nobel (1919)
Borgslægtens historie - Ketill aka Gæst (1920) (Iceland)
Growth of the Soil - Geissler, lensmannen (1921)
Lykkens galoscher (1921)

Director
Lykkens Pamfilius (1917)
Borgslægtens historie (1920)
Growth of the Soil (1921)
Lykkens galoscher (1921)

Writer
Growth of the Soil (1921)
Lykkens galoscher (1921)

References

External links

Gunnar Sommerfeldt - Danmark Nationalfilmografi at dnfx.dfi.dk

Danish male actors
Danish male silent film actors
20th-century Danish male actors
Danish male film actors
Danish film directors
1890 births
1947 deaths